A Eurasian is a person of mixed Asian and European ancestry.

Terminology
The term Eurasian was first coined in mid-nineteenth century British India. The term was originally used to refer to those who are now known as Anglo-Indians, people of mixed British and Indian descent. 
In addition to British many were also of mixed Portuguese, Dutch, Irish or French descent. The term has been used in anthropological literature since the 1960s.

Central Asia

Historically, Central Asia has been a "melting pot" of West Eurasian and East Eurasian peoples, leading to high genetic admixture and diversity. Physical and genetic analyses of ancient remains have concluded that while the Scythians – including those in the eastern Pazyryk region – possessed predominantly features found (among others) in Europoid phenotypes, mixed Eurasian phenotypes were also observed, suggesting that the Scythians as a whole were descended in part from East Eurasian populations.

The Xiongnu were nomadic warriors who invaded China and Central Asia. They were predominantly Mongoloid, known from their skeletal remains and artifacts. Analysis of skeletal remains from sites attributed to the Xiongnu provides an identification of dolichocephalic Mongoloid. Russian and Chinese anthropological and craniofacial studies show that the Xiongnu were physically very heterogeneous, with six different population clusters showing different degrees of Mongoloid and Caucasoid physical traits. A majority (89%) of the Xiongnu mtDNA sequences can be classified as belonging to Asian haplogroups, and nearly 11% belong to European haplogroups. This finding indicates that contact between European and Asian populations preceded the start of Xiongnu culture, and confirms results reported for two samples from an early 3rd century BC Scytho-Siberian population (Clisson et al. 2002).

Anthropologist SA Pletnev studied a group of burials of Kipchaks in the Volga region and found them to have Caucasoid features with some admixture of Mongoloid traits, with physical characteristics such as a flat face and distinctly protruding nose. They were nomadic people that, together with the Cumans, ruled areas stretching from Kazakhstan through Caucasus to Eastern Europe.

The Hunnic invaders of Europe were also of mixed origins. Hungarian archaeologist István Bóna argues that most European Huns were of Caucasoid ancestry and that less than 20–25% were of Mongoloid stock. According to the Hungarian anthropologist Pál Lipták (1955) he believed Turanid race was most common among the Huns. He classified Turanid as a Caucasoid type with significant Mongoloid admixture, arising from the mixture of the Andronovo type of Europoid features and the Oriental (Mongoloid).
The Eurasian Avars were group of sixth-century nomadic warriors that came from Northern Central Asia who ruled in what is today Central Europe. Anthropological research has revealed several skeletons with Mongoloid-type features, additionally there was continuing cultural influence from the Eurasian nomadic steppe. The early Avar anthropological material was said to be 20% Mongoloid, 40% Eurasian (mixed), and 40% Caucasoid, in the seventh century according to Pál Lipták, while grave-goods indicated Middle and Central Asian parallels. Mongoloid and Euro-Mongoloid types compose about one-third of the total population of the Avar graves of the eighth century with the late Avar Period showing more hybridization resulting in higher frequencies of Europo-Mongolids.

The Seljuk Empire which ruled from Central Asia, Middle East to modern Turkey, their descendants are the Iranian Turkmen and Afghan Turkmen and are mixture of East Eurasian and West Eurasian.

Ladislaus' mother was the daughter of a Cuman chief. Like the Kipchaks, the Cuman invaders of Europe were also of mixed anthropological origins. Excavations in Csengele, Hungary, have revealed normatively East Asian and European traits. Five of the six skeletons that were complete enough for anthropometric analysis appeared Asian rather than European.

Today Central Asians are a mixture of various peoples, such as Mongols, Turks, and Iranians. The Mongol conquest of Central Asia in the 13th century resulted in the mass killings of the Iranian-speaking people and Indo-Europeans population of the region, their culture and languages being superseded by that of the Mongolian-Turkic peoples. The invasions of Bukhara, Samarkand, Urgench and others resulted in mass murders and unprecedented destruction, such as portions of Khwarezmia being completely razed. The remaining surviving population were either displaced or assimilated with intermarriage with invaders. Genetic studies indicates all Central Asian ethnicities share a various genetic mixture of East Eurasian and West Eurasian.

Many Eurasian ethnic groups arose during the Mongol invasion of Europe. The ruling Mongol elites of the Mongol successor states began a process of assimilation with the non-Mongol populations that they had conquered and ruled over. The Golden Horde which ruled eastern Europe resulted in an assimilation and mixture of Mongols, Turkic, Finns, Hungarians, Sarmato-Scythians, Slavs, and people from the Caucasus, among others (whether Muslim or not). Partial Mongol descendants of people from Central Asia and North Caucasus, such as the Uzbeks, Kazakhs, and Nogais, also created many Eurasian ethnic groups under the empires they established (for example, the Timurid Empire, Mughal Empire, Kazakh Khanate, and Nogai Horde), which invaded or covered vast areas that are parts of modern Russia, the Caucasus, the Middle East, Central Asia, and South Asia.

Interracial marriage between Turkic, European, Central Asians in Kazakhstan are increasingly common. In 2021 at least 4728 ethnic Kazakhs had married people of other ethnicity, most commonly Russians. Among Kirgiz men living in Uzbekistan and married to non-Kirgiz women, 9.6% had married Russians, 25.6% Uzbeks, and 34.3% Tatars. Among Kazakh men in Uzbekistan, the structure of mixed marriages appeared as follows: 4.4% married Russians.

Southeast Asia

European colonization of vast swathes of Southeast Asia led to the burgeoning of Eurasian populations, particularly in Indonesia, Malaysia, Singapore, Timor-Leste, Vietnam and the Philippines. The majority of Eurasians in Southeast Asia formed a separate community from the indigenous peoples and the European colonizers, and served as middlemen between the two. 
Post-colonial Eurasians can be found in practically every country in Southeast Asia, most especially in the Philippines due to the 333 years of colonization by Spain, 4 years of British settlement and 49 years of American occupation which gives the country the longest unstopping 382 years of continuously European exposure in Southeast Asia. Burma was colonized by the British for 124 years, the French colonized Indochina for 67 years, the British colonized Malaya for 120 years and Dutch colonized Indonesia for 149 years after Portugal.

Cambodia
In the last official census in French Indochina in 1946, there were 45,000 Europeans in Vietnam, Laos, and Cambodia. One-fifth were Eurasian.
Jean-François Izzi, a French banker of Italian origin, was the father of the Queen Mother of Cambodia, Norodom Monineath. The son of Norodom Monineath is the reigning king of Cambodia, Norodom Sihamoni.

Indonesia

The Eurasian community from Indonesia developed over a period of 400 years, it began with a mostly Portuguese Indonesian ancestry and ended with a dominant Dutch-Indonesian ancestry after the arrival of the Dutch East India Company in Indonesia in 1603 and near continuous Dutch rule until the Japanese occupation of Indonesia in World War II.

Indo is a term for Europeans, Asians, and Eurasian people who were a migrant population that associated themselves with and experienced the colonial culture of the former Dutch East Indies, a Dutch colony in Southeast Asia that became Indonesia after World War II. It was used to describe people acknowledged to be of mixed Dutch and Indonesian descent, or it was a term used in the Dutch East Indies to apply to Europeans who had partial Asian ancestry. The European ancestry of these people was predominantly Dutch, and also Portuguese, British, French, Belgian, German, and others.

Other terms used were Indos, Dutch Indonesians, Eurasians, Indo-Europeans, Indo-Dutch, and Dutch-Indos.

Malaysia

There are over 29,000 Eurasians living in Malaysia, the vast majority of whom are of Portuguese descent.

In East Malaysia, the exact number of Eurasians are unknown. Recent DNA studies by Stanford found that 7.8% of samples from Kota Kinabalu have European chromosomes.

Philippines

Eurasians are collectively called Mestizos in the Philippines. The vast majority are descendants of Spanish, Latino and American settlers who intermarried with people of indigenous Filipino descent.  Aside from the more common Spanish, Latino and American mestizos, there are also Eurasians in the Philippines who have ancestries from various European countries or Australia. Significant intermarriage between Filipinos and European Americans has occurred since the United States colonial period up to the present day, as the US had numerous people stationed there at military bases.

Most Eurasians of Spanish or Latino descent own business conglomerates in the real estate, agriculture, and utilities sector, whereas Eurasians of white American descent are largely in the entertainment industry which are one of the biggest industries in the Philippines working as reporters, writers, producers, directors, models, actors and actresses as modern Philippine mass media and entertainment industry was pioneered during the American colonization of the Philippines by the Americans. Many of them also works in offices and call centers; the Philippines being the call center capital of the world.The actual number of Eurasians in the Philippines cannot be ascertained due to lack of surveys, although Spanish censuses record that as much as one third of the inhabitants of the island of Luzon possess varying degrees of Spanish or Latino admixture. A 2019 study by Anthropologist Matthew Go, postulates that the percentage of Filipino bodies who were sampled from the University of the Philippines, that were curated to be representative of Filipinos, that is phenotypically classified as Asian (East, South and Southeast Asian) is 72.7%, Hispanic (Spanish-Amerindian Mestizo, Latin American, or Spanish-Malay Mestizo) is at 12.7%, Indigenous American (Native American) at 7.3%, African (Sub-Saharan African) at 4.5%, and European at 2.7%.

As opposed to the policies of other colonial powers such as the British or the Dutch, the Spanish colonies were devoid of any anti-miscegenation laws.

The Spanish implemented incentives to deliberately entangle the various races together in order to stop rebellion: – It is needful to encourage public instruction in all ways possible, permit newspapers subject to a liberal censure, to establish in Manila a college of medicine, surgery, and pharmacy: in order to break down the barriers that divide the races, and amalgamate them all into one. For that purpose, the Spaniards of the country, the Chinese mestizos, and the Filipinos shall be admitted with perfect equality as cadets of the military corps; the personal-service tax shall be abolished, or an equal and general tax shall be imposed, to which all the Spaniards shall be subject. This last plan appears to me more advisable, as the poll-tax is already established, and it is not opportune to make a trial of new taxes when it is a question of allowing the country to be governed by itself. Since the annual tribute is unequal, the average shall be taken and shall be fixed, consequently, at fifteen or sixteen reals per whole tribute, or perhaps one peso fuerte annually from each adult tributary person. This regulation will produce an increase in the revenue of 200,000 or 300,000 pesos fuertes, and this sum shall be set aside to give the impulse for the amalgamation of the races, favoring crossed marriages by means of dowries granted to the single women in the following manner. To a Chinese mestizo woman who marries a Filipino shall be given 100 pesos; to a Filipino woman who marries a Chinese mestizo, Ioo pesos; to a Chinese mestizo woman who marries a Spaniard, 1,000 pesos; to a Spanish woman who marries a Chinese mestizo, 2,000 pesos; to a Filipino woman who marries a Spaniard, 2,000 pesos; to a Spanish woman who marries a Filipino chief, 3,000 or 4,000 pesos. Some mestizo and Filipino alcaldes-mayor of the provinces shall be appointed. It shall be ordered that when a Filipino chief goes to the house of a Spaniard, he shall seat himself as the latter's equal. In a word, by these and other means, the idea that they and the Castilians are two kinds of distinct races shall be erased from the minds of the natives, and the families shall become related by marriage in such manner that when free of the Castilian dominion should any exalted Filipinos try to expel or enslave our race, they would find it so interlaced with their own that their plan would be practically impossible.

The fluid nature of racial integration in the Philippines during the Spanish colonial period was recorded by many travelers and public figures at the time, who were favorably impressed by the lack of racial discrimination, as compared to the situation in other European colonies.

Among them was Sir John Bowring, governor general of British Hong Kong and a well-seasoned traveler who had written several books about the different cultures in Asia, who described the situation as "admirable" during a visit to the Philippines in the 1870s.
The lines separating entire classes and races, appeared to me less marked than in the Oriental colonies. I have seen on the same table, Spaniards, Mestizos (Chinos cristianos) and Indios, priests and military. There is no doubt that having one Religion forms great bonding. And more so to the eyes of one that has been observing the repulsion and differences due to race in many parts of Asia. And from one (like myself) who knows that race is the great divider of society, the admirable contrast and exception to racial discrimination so markedly presented by the people of the Philippines is indeed admirable.

Another foreign witness was English engineer, Frederic H. Sawyer, who had spent most of his life in different parts of Asia and lived in Luzon for fourteen years. His impression was that as far as racial integration and harmony was concerned, the situation in the Philippines was not equaled by any other colonial power:
"... Spaniards and natives lived together in great harmony, and do not know where I could find a colony in which Europeans mixes as much socially with the natives.
Not in Java, where a native of position must dismount to salute the humblest Dutchman.
Not in British India, where the Englishwoman has now made the gulf between British and native into a bottomless pit."

Singapore

Singaporean Eurasians of European ancestry mainly descend from Western European emigrants, although Eurasian migrants to Singapore in the 19th century came mainly from other European colonies in Asia as well. When the European colonisation of Singapore began, the colonisers brought into being a new ethnic group known historically and generally as the Eurasians. Early European colonisers were not accompanied by their womenfolk on the perilous journey to Asia. Consequently, many married the local women of these lands, or formed liaisons with them. Today, Singaporeans of Eurasian descent make up about 0.4% of the Singaporean population, with 16,900 individuals living in Singapore in 2015.

Thailand

In the mid-20th century, the number of luk khrueng increased dramatically in the period following World War II, with the increasing number of Western residents and visitors to the country. Many were the children of American servicemen who came to the country in the 1960s and the 1970s, when there were several large US military bases in the country because of the Vietnam War. While some of the servicemen formed lasting relationships with Thai women, some luk khrueng were the product of temporary relationships with "rented wives", or prostitutes, a fact that led to some discrimination in that era. Some Thais were also hostile because of the perceived lack of racial purity, but most were quite accepting.

Like certain other parts of Asia, luk khrueng have become popular in the entertainment and modelling industries and many have carved out prominent roles in the entertainment industry with their mixed Caucasian and Thai features which are deemed attractive in modern Thai culture.

Vietnam

In the last official census in French Indochina in 1946, there were 45,000 Europeans in Vietnam, Laos, and Cambodia – of which one-fifth were Eurasian. Much of the business conducted with foreign men in Southeast Asia was done by the local women, who engaged in both sexual and mercantile intercourse with foreign male traders. A Portuguese and Malay speaking Vietnamese woman who lived in Macau for an extensive period of time was the person who interpreted for the first diplomatic meeting between Cochin-China and a Dutch delegation. She served as an interpreter for three decades in the Cochin-China court with an old woman who had been married to three husbands; one Vietnamese and two Portuguese. The cosmopolitan exchange was facilitated by the marriage of Vietnamese women to Portuguese merchants. Those Vietnamese woman were married to Portuguese men and lived in Macao which was how they became fluent in Malay and Portuguese. Alexander Hamilton said that "The Tonquiners used to be very desirous of having a brood of Europeans in their country, for which reason the greatest nobles thought it no shame or disgrace to marry their daughters to English and Dutch seamen, for the time they were to stay in Tonquin, and often presented their sons-in-law pretty handsomely at their departure, especially if they left their wives with child; but adultery was dangerous to the husband, for they are well versed in the art of poisoning."

Vietnam saw a surge in its Eurasian population following the entry of the United States as an active combatant in the Vietnam War in 1965. Large numbers of white American soldiers were deployed in South Vietnam to support the country, and intermingling with local Vietnamese women was common. The resulting Eurasian children, known as Amerasians, were products of varying circumstances ranging from genuine long-term relationships and love affairs to prostitution and rape. When the war was going against South Vietnam in the early 1970s, the gradual withdrawal of American troops during the Vietnamization process included many Vietnamese war brides and their Eurasian children. The situation led the United States Congress to enact the American Homecoming Act, granting preferential immigration status specifically to Eurasian children born to servicemen in Vietnam claimed by their fathers. The Eurasian children that remained in Vietnam, around 20,000, were typically from the worst circumstances, fatherless, and often ended up in orphanages as their mothers were incapable or uninterested in raising them. The North Vietnamese victory in 1975 saw greater stigma against Eurasian Vietnamese children, as the new government of reunified Vietnam was hostile to the United States and saw them as symbols of foreign occupation. The poor circumstances of the Amerasian children made them vulnerable to severe social and state-sponsored persecution.

East Asia

Hong Kong

In 19th century Hong Kong, Eurasian or "half-caste" children were often stigmatised as symbols of 'moral degradation' and 'racial impurity' by both European and Chinese communities. According to Chiu:
To the European community, such children were the ‘tangible evidence of moral irregularity’, while to the Chinese community they embodied the shame and ‘evil’ of their marginalised mothers. Stewart has commented that, ‘The word "barbarian" on the lip of a Greek contained but an iota of the contempt which the Chinese entertain for such persons’.

In the 1890s Ernst Johann Eitel, a German missionary, controversially claimed that most "half-caste" people in Hong Kong were descended exclusively from Europeans having relationships with outcast groups such as the Tanka people. Carl Smith's study in the 1960s on "protected women" (the kept mistresses of foreigners) to an extent supports Eitel's theory. The Tanka were marginalised in Chinese society which consisted of the majority Puntis (Cantonese-speaking people). Custom precluded their intermarriage with the Cantonese and Hakka-speaking populations and they had limited opportunities of settlement on land. Consequently, the Tanka did not experience the same social pressures when dealing with Europeans. Eitel's theory, however, was criticised by Henry J. Lethbridge writing in the 1970s as a "myth" propagated by xenophobic Cantonese to account for the establishment of the Hong Kong Eurasian community. Many Eurasians of part-Chinese blood in Hong Kong at that time were children of British settlers and their Chinese wives from British colonies in Southeast Asia.

Andrew and Bushnell (2006) wrote extensively on the position of women in the British Empire and the Tanka inhabitants of Hong Kong and their position in the prostitution industry, catering towards foreign sailors. The Tanka did not marry with the Chinese; being descendants of the natives, they were restricted to the waterways. They supplied their women as prostitutes to British sailors and assisted the British in their military actions around Hong Kong. The Tanka in Hong Kong were considered "outcasts" categorised low class.

Ordinary Chinese prostitutes were afraid of serving Westerners since they looked strange to them, while the Tanka prostitutes freely mingled with western men. The Tanka assisted the Europeans with supplies and providing them with prostitutes. European men in Hong Kong easily formed relations with the Tanka prostitutes. The profession of prostitution among the Tanka women led to them being hated by the Chinese both because they had sex with westerners and them being racially Tanka.

Elizabeth Wheeler Andrew (1845–1917) and Katharine Caroline Bushnell (1856–1946) wrote extensively about the position of women in the British Empire. Published in 1907, Heathen Slaves and Christian Rulers, which examined the exploitation of Chinese women in Hong Kong under colonial rule, discussed the Tanka inhabitants of Hong Kong and their position in the prostitution industry, catering towards foreign sailors. The Tanka did not marry with the Chinese, being descendants of the natives, they were restricted to the waterways. They supplied their women as prostitutes to British sailors and assisted the British in their military actions around Hong Kong. The Tanka in Hong Kong were considered as "outcasts". Tanka women were ostracized from the Cantonese community, and were nicknamed "salt water girls" (ham shui mui) for their services as prostitutes to foreigners in Hong Kong.

Notable examples of Eurasian people from Hong Kong include Nancy Kwan, once a Hollywood sex symbol, born to a Cantonese father and English and Scottish mother, Bruce Lee, a martial artist icon born to a Cantonese father and a Eurasian mother of Cantonese and German descent, and Macao-born actress Isabella Leong, born to a Portuguese-English father and a Chinese mother. The wealthy Jewish Dutch man Charles Maurice Bosman was the father of the brothers Sir Robert Hotung and Ho Fook who was the grandfather of Stanley Ho. The number of people who identified as "Mixed with one Chinese parent" according to the 2001 Hong Kong census was 16,587, which had risen to 24,649 in 2011.

Macau
The early Macanese ethnic group was formed from Portuguese men with Malay, Japanese, Indian and Sinhalese women. The Portuguese encouraged Cantonese migration to Macau, and most Macanese in Macau were formed from between Portuguese and Cantonese. In 1810, the total population of Macau was about 4033, of which 1172 were white men, 1830 were white women, 425 male slaves, and 606 female slaves. In 1830, the population increased to 4480 and the breakdown was 1,202 white men, 2149 white women, 350 male slaves and 779 female slaves. There is reason to speculate that large numbers of white women were involved in some forms of prostitution which would probably explain the abnormality in the ratio between men and women among the white population. Majority of the early Cantonese-Portuguese intermarriages were between Portuguese men and women of Tanka origin, who were considered the lowest class of people in China and had relations with Portuguese settlers and sailors, or low class Chinese women. Western men like the Portuguese were refused by high class Cantonese women, who did not marry foreigners.

While a minority were Cantonese men and Portuguese women. Macanese men and women also married with the Portuguese and Cantonese, as a result, some Macanese became indistinguishable from the Cantonese or Portuguese population. Because the majority of the population who migrated to Macau were Cantonese, Macau became a culturally Cantonese-speaking society, other ethnic groups became fluent in Cantonese. Most Macanese had paternal Portuguese heritage until 1974. It was in 1980s that Macanese and Portuguese women began to marry men who defined themselves ethnically as Chinese, which resulted in many Macanese with Cantonese paternal ancestry. Many Chinese became Macanese simply by converting to Catholicism, and had no ancestry from the Portuguese, having assimilated into the Macanese people since they were rejected by non Christian Chinese.

After the handover of Macau to China in 1999 many Macanese migrated to other countries. Of the Portuguese and Macanese women who stayed in Macau married with local Cantonese men, resulting in more Macanese with Cantonese paternal heritage. There are between 25,000 and 46,000 Macanese; 5,000–8,000 of whom live in Macau, while most live in Latin America (most particularly Brazil), America, and Portugal. Unlike the Macanese of Macau who are almost all of Chinese and Portuguese heritage, many of the Macanese populations living abroad are not entirely of Portuguese and Chinese ancestry; many Macanese men and women intermarried with the local population of America and Latin America etc. and have only partial Macanese heritage.

Taiwan
During the Siege of Fort Zeelandia in which Chinese Ming loyalist forces commanded by Koxinga besieged and defeated the Dutch East India Company and conquered Taiwan, the Chinese took Dutch women and children prisoner. Koxinga took Hambroek's teenage daughter as a concubine, and Dutch women were sold to Chinese soldiers to become their wives. In 1684 some of these Dutch wives were still captives of the Chinese.

China 
Ethnic Russians first arrived in large numbers in northeast China during the 1890s as colonists and marriages between Russian women and Han Chinese men started at the same time as the migration. The descendants of the interracial marriages are concentrated in the towns and villages of the frontier areas along the Ergun River of Inner Mongolia like Shiwei and Enhe. Interracial marriages between Chinese women and Russian men were rare, a marriage pattern that does not fit the European colonial convention of Western men marrying native women. Unions between Chinese and Russians were also rare in urban areas like Harbin where there was prejudice against mixed marriages on both sides.

Japan

Amerasian Japanese in Okinawa and Japan are mostly the result of European American soldiers and Japanese women.
Many Latin Americans in Japan (known in their own cultures as dekasegi) are mixed, including Brazilians of Portuguese, Italian, German, Spaniard, Polish and Ukrainian descent. In Mexico and Argentina, for example, those mixed between nikkei and non-nikkei are called mestizos de japonés, while in Brazil both mestiço de japonês and ainoko, ainoco or even hafu are common terms.

Historian S. Kuznetsov, dean of the Department of History of the Irkutsk State University, one of the first researchers of the topic, interviewed thousands of former internees and came to the following conclusion: What is more, romantic relations between Japanese internees and Russian women were not uncommon. For example, in the city of Kansk, Krasnoyarsk Krai, about 50 Japanese married locals and stayed. Today many Russian women married Japanese men, often for the benefit of long-term residence and work rights. Some of their mixed offspring stay in Japan while other's to Russia.

South Korea

U.S. military personnel married 6423 Korean women as war brides during and immediately after the Korean War. The average number of Korean women marrying US military personnel each year was about 1500 per year in the 1960s and 2300 per year in the 1970s.
Many of these children were orphaned or stigmatized by the local population and were often kept separate in designated camptowns and eventually exported to the United States.

South Asia

Bangladesh
There are about 97,000 Anglo Indians in Bangladesh. 55% of them are Christians.

Burma (Myanmar)

The Anglo-Burmese emerged as a distinct community through mixed relations (sometimes permanent, sometimes temporary) between the British and other European settlers and the indigenous peoples of Burma from 1826 until 1948 when Myanmar gained its independence from the United Kingdom.

Collectively, in the Burmese language, Eurasians are specifically known as bo kabya; the term kabya refers to persons of mixed ancestry or dual ethnicity.

India

The first use of the term Anglo-Indian referred to all British people living in India, regardless of whether they had Indian ancestors or not. The meaning changed to include only people who were of the very specific lineage descending from the British on the male side and women from the Indian side. People of mixed British and Indian descent were previously referred to as simply 'Eurasians'.

During the British East India Company's rule in India as well as the British Raj period, it was initially fairly common for British officers and soldiers to take local Indian wives and have Eurasian children. European women were barred from being with native men. Marriages between European men and Indian women were fairly common during early colonial times. The scholar Michael Fisher estimates that one in three European men stationed during the company rule had an Indian wife. The Europeans (mostly Portuguese, Dutch, French, German, Irish, Scottish, and English) were stationed in India in their youth, and looked for relationships with local women. The most famous of such unions was between the Hyderabadi noblewoman Khair-un-Nissa and the Scottish resident James Achilles Kirkpatrick. In addition to intermarriage, inter-ethnic prostitution in India existed. Generally, Muslim women did not marry European men because the men were not of the Islamic faith. Similarly with high caste Hindu women.
By the mid-nineteenth century, there were around 40,000 British soldiers but fewer than 2000 British officials present in India. As British women began arriving to India in large numbers around the early-to-mid-nineteenth century, mostly as family members of British officers and soldiers, intermarriage with Indians became less frequent among the British in India.  After the events of the Indian Rebellion of 1857, such intermarriage was considered undesirable by both cultures.  The colonial government passed several anti-miscegenation laws. As a result, Eurasians became more marginal to both the British and Indian populations in India.

Over generations, Anglo-Indians intermarried with other Anglo-Indians to form a community that developed a culture of its own. They created distinctive Anglo-Indian, dress, speech and religion.  They established a school system focused on English language and culture, and formed social clubs and associations to run functions, such as regular dances, at holidays such as Christmas and Easter. Over time, the British colonial government recruited Anglo-Indians into the Customs and Excise, Post and Telegraphs, Forestry Department, the Railways and teaching professions, but they were employed in many other fields as well. A number of factors fostered a strong sense of community among Anglo-Indians. Their English-language school system, their Anglocentric culture, and their Christian beliefs helped bind them together. Today, an estimated 300,000-1 million Anglo-Indians worldwide.

Sri Lanka

Due to prolonged colonial contact with Portugal, the Netherlands and Britain, Sri Lanka has had a long history of intermarriage between locals and colonists. Originally these people were known as Mestiços, literally "mixed people" in Portuguese; today they are collectively classified as Burghers. The Sri Lankan Civil War prompted numerous Burghers to flee the island. Most of them settled in Europe, the Americas, Australia and New Zealand.

Portuguese Burghers are usually descended from a Sri Lankan mother and a Portuguese father. This configuration is also the case with the Dutch Burghers. When the Portuguese arrived on the island in 1505, they were accompanied by African slaves. Kaffirs are a mix of African, Portuguese colonist and Sri Lankan. The free mixing between the various groups of people was encouraged by the colonials.  Soon the Mestiços or the "Mixed People" began speaking a creole known as the Ceylonese-Portuguese Creole. It was based on Portuguese, Sinhalese and Tamil.

The Burgher population numbers 40,000 in Sri Lanka and thousands more worldwide, concentrated mostly in the United Kingdom, Canada, Australia and New Zealand. Phenotypically Burghers can have skin ranging from light to darker, depending on their ancestors, even within the same family. Burghers with dark to light brown skin usually are of Portuguese Burghers or Kaffir ancestry; they may also have European facial features common to the Mediterranean basin (see Mediterraneans). They have a distinct look compared to native Sri Lankans. Most light-skinned Burghers are of Dutch or British descent. Most Burghers are Roman Catholic in religion.

Like certain other Asian countries -Japan, Malaysia, Thailand, Singapore and the Philippines- Eurasians/Burghers have also been sought after by advertisers and modelling agencies in Sri Lanka. Their mixed look combining both Western and Sri Lankan features makes them attractive to advertisers who see them as a representation of an "exotic Sri Lankan/Sinhalese". Predictions within the advertising industry in Sri Lanka estimate that more than 50% of advertising models in Sri Lanka are Burghers/Eurasians.

Europe

Immigration to Europe has led to the rise of Eurasian communities in Europe, most prominently in the Netherlands, Spain, and United Kingdom, where significant numbers of Indonesian, Filipino, and Indo-Pakistani Eurasians live. The Turkish Empire spanned large parts of Europe and gave rise to populations with mixed ancestry in their former territories.

Historically East-Eurasian (East Asian-related) migrations and invasions into Europe left genetic traces in the respective regions. Noteworthy are the Huns, the Pannonian Avars, the Mongols, the Finnic peoples and some other historical groups.

Netherlands 

Dutch Eurasians of part Indonesian descent, also called Indos or Indo-Europeans, have largely assimilated in the Netherlands arriving in the Netherlands following the end of World War II until 1965, their diaspora a result of Indonesia gaining its independence from Dutch colonial rule. Statistics show high inter marriage rates with native Dutch (50–80%). With over 500,000 persons, they are the largest ethnic minority in the Netherlands. So-called Indo rockers such as the Tielman Brothers introduced their blend of rock and roll music to Dutch audiences, whereas others gained fame as singers and TV presenters, such as Rob de Nijs and Sandra Reemer. There are also famous Indo soccer players such as Giovanni van Bronckhorst. Well-known politicians, such as Christian democrat Hans van den Broek and politician Geert Wilders, are also of Indo descent.

France 
Vietnamese men married French women but most of the time had to hide their relationship through casual sexual encounters, brothels and workplaces, some Eurasians were born as result. According to official records in 1918, of the Vietnamese men and French women, 250 had married officially and 1363 couples were living together without the approval of the French parental consent and without the approval of French authorities.

Spain 

Spanish Eurasians, called Mestizos, most of whom are of partial Filipino ancestry, make up a small but important minority in Spain. Numbering about 115,000, they consist of early migrants to Spain after the loss of the Philippines to the United States in 1898.

Well known Spanish Eurasians include actress and socialite Isabel Preysler and her son Enrique Iglesias, as well as former Prime Minister Marcelo Azcarraga Palmero.

United Kingdom

Interracial marriage was fairly common in Britain since the seventeenth century, when the British East India Company began bringing over thousands of Indian scholars, lascars and workers (mostly Bengali and/or Muslim) to Britain.  Many married local white British women and girls, due to the absence of Indian women in Britain at the time. This later became an issue, as a magistrate of the London Tower Hamlets area in 1817 expressed disgust at how the local British women and girls in the area were marrying and cohabiting with foreign South Asian lascars. Nevertheless, there were no legal restrictions against 'mixed' marriages in Britain, unlike the restrictions in India. This led to "mixed race" Eurasian (Anglo-Indian) children in Britain, which challenged the British elite efforts to "define them using simple dichotomies of British versus Indian, ruler versus ruled." By the mid-nineteenth century, there were more than 40,000 Indian seamen, diplomats, scholars, soldiers, officials, tourists, businessmen and students arriving in Britain, and by the time World War I began, there were 51,616 Indian lascar seamen residing in Britain. In addition, the British officers and soldiers who had Indian wives and Eurasian children in British India often brought them to Britain in the nineteenth century.

An estimated 900 Chinese-Eurasian born as result of marriages from Chinese fathers and white mothers of various ethnic backgrounds; the most common being British and Irish. Most British-Chinese of Eurasian origin were concentrated in around the Liverpool area of Chinatown, where there was a growing Chinese-Eurasian community. Many of them had assimilated with other ethnic Chinese, while others assimilated with mainstream British population.

Following World War I, there were more women than men in Britain, and there were increasing numbers of seamen arriving from abroad, mostly from the Indian subcontinent, in addition to smaller numbers from Yemen, Malaysia and China. This led to increased intermarriage and cohabitation with local white females. Some residents grew concerned about miscegenation and there were several race riots at the time. In the 1920s to 1940s, several writers raised concerns about an increasing 'mixed-breed' population, born mainly from Muslim Asian (mostly South Asian in addition to Arab and Malaysian) fathers and local white mothers, occasionally out of wedlock. They denounced white girls who mixed with Muslim Asian men as 'shameless' and called for a ban on the breeding of 'half-caste' children. Such attempts at imposing anti-miscegenation laws were unsuccessful. As South Asian women began arriving in Britain in large numbers from the 1970s, mostly as family members, intermarriage rates have decreased in the British Asian community, although the size of the community has increased. As of 2006, there are 246,400 'British Mixed-Race' people of European and South Asian descent.

There is also a small Eurasian community in Liverpool. The first Chinese settlers were mainly Cantonese from south China some were also from Shanghai. The figures of Chinese for 1921 are 2157 men and 262 women. Many Chinese men married British women while others remained single, possibly supporting a wife and family back home in China. During World War II  (1939–1945) another wave of Chinese seamen from Shanghai and of Cantonese origin married British women. Records show that about some 300 of these men had married British women and supported families. A estimated 900 Chinese-Eurasian born as result of marriages from Chinese fathers and white mothers of various ethnic backgrounds; the most common being British and Irish. Most British-Chinese of Eurasian origin were concentrated in around the Liverpool area of Chinatown, where there was a growing Chinese-Eurasian community. Many of them had assimilated with other ethnic Chinese, while others assimilated with mainstream British population.

North America

Canada

Cuba

There were almost no women among the nearly entirely male Chinese coolie population that migrated to Cuba. In Cuba some Indian (Native American), mulatto, black, and white women engaged in carnal relations or marriages with Chinese men, with marriages of mulatto, black, and white woman being reported by the Cuba Commission Report.

120,000 Cantonese 'coolies' (all males) entered Cuba under contract for 80 years. Most of these men did not marry, but Hung Hui (1975:80) cites there was a frequency of sexual activity between black women and these Asian immigrants. According to Osberg (1965:69) the free Chinese practice of buying slave women and then freeing them expressly for marriage was utilized at length. In the nineteenth and twentieth centuries, Chinese men (Cantonese) engaged in sexual activity with white Cuban women and black Cuban women, and from such relations many children were born. (For a British Caribbean model of Chinese cultural retention through procreation with black women, see Patterson, 322–31).

In the 1920s an additional 30,000 Cantonese and small groups of Japanese also arrived; both immigrant groups were exclusively male, and there was rapid intermarriage with white, black, and mulato populations. CIA World Factbook. Cuba. 2008. 15 May 2008. claimed 114,240 Chinese-Cuban with only 300 pure Chinese.

In the study of genetic origin, admixture, and asymmetry in maternal and paternal human lineages in Cuba. Thirty-five Y-chromosome SNPs were typed in the 132 male individuals of the Cuban sample. The study does not include any people with some Chinese ancestry. All the samples were white Cubans and black Cubans. Two out of 132 male sample belong to East Asian Haplogroup O2 which is found in significant frequencies among Cantonese people is found in 1.5% of Cuban population.

Costa Rica

The Chinese originated from the Cantonese male migrants. Pure Chinese make up only 1% of the Costa Rican population but according to Jacqueline M. Newman close to 10% of Costa Ricans are of Chinese descent or married to a Chinese. Most Chinese immigrants since then have been Cantonese, but in the last decades of the twentieth century, a number of immigrants have also come from Taiwan. Many men came alone to work and married Costa Rican women and speak Cantonese. However the majority of the descendants of the first Chinese immigrants no longer speak Cantonese and feel themselves to be Costa Ricans. They married Tican women (who are a blend of Europeans, Castizos, Mestizos, Indian, black). A Tican is also a white person with a small portion of nonwhite blood like Castizos. The census In 1989 shows about 98% of Costa Ricans were either white, castizos, mestizos, with 80% being white or Castizos.

Mexico

A marriage between a Chinese man and a white Mexican woman was recorded in "Current anthropological literature, Volumes 1–2", published in 1912, titled "Note on two children born to a Chinese and a Mexican white"- "Note sur deux enfants nes d'un chinois et d une mexicaine de race blanche. (Ibid., 122–125, portr.) Treats briefly of Chen Tean (of Hong Kong), his wife, Inez Mancha (a white Mexican), married in 1907, and their children, a boy (b. April 14, 1908) and a girl (b. Sept. 24, 1909). The boy is of marked Chinese type, the girl much more European. No Mongolian spots were noticed at birth. Both children were born with red cheeks. Neither has ever been sick. The boy began to walk at ten months, the girl a little after a year."

Mexican women and Chinese men initiated free unions with each other as recorded by the Chihuahua and Sonora census records, a number Chinese men and their Mexican wives and children came to China to live there while a big number of Chinese-Mexican families were entirely expelled from northern Mexico to China, during the early 1930s 500 Chinese-Mexican families, numbering around 2,000 people in total came to China, with a large number of them settling in Portuguese Macau and forming their own ghetto there since they were drawn to the Catholic and Iberian culture of Macau. A lot of couples ended up divorcing in China due to a huge variety of factors which caused stress like culture, economic, and familial with the men leaving Macau with hundreds of Mexican women and mixed children alone. Mexican women in Macau rearing their mixed Chinese children wanted to return to Mexico saying "Even if we have to scrape bittersweet potatoes in the sierra, we want Mexico." and Mexico under President Lázaro Cardenas allowed over 400 Mexican women and their children to come back in 1937–1938 after the women petitioned, after World War II, some Chinese Mexican families also came back and after a petition by mixed race Chinese-Mexicans who had been deported from Mexico and raised in Macau led another campaign to allow them to return home in 1960. Children which were born to Mexican women and sired by Chinese men were counted as ethnic Chinese by Mexican census takers since they were not considered Mexicans by the general public and viewed as Chinese. The Mexican ideology of mestizaje portrayed the quintessential Mexican identity as being made from a mix of indigenous native and Spanish white, with Mexico being portrayed by racial ideologues as being made out of a south populated by indigenous natives, a central part populated by mixed white-native Mestizos, and a north populated by white Spanish creoles, Sonora was where these white Spanish creoles lived, and the marriage of Chinese with Mexicans was portrayed as particularly threatening to the white identity of Sonora and to the concept of mixed mestizaje identity of indigenous natives and Spanish since the Chinese-Mexican mixed children did not fit into this identity.

The anti-Chinese campaigns resulted in an exodus of Chinese leaving northern Mexican states like Sonora, Sinaloa, Coahuila, Chihuahua and Mexicali, with the Chinese and their families being stripped of the property they took with them as they were forced across the Mexican border into America, where they would be sent back to China, Dr. David Trembly MacDougal said "many of these departing Chinese have married Mexican women, some of whom with their children accompany them into exile.", and after "a lifetime of skillful and honest work" they were driven into poverty by the loss of their property.

Mexico's international image was being damaged by the anti-Chinese expulsion campaign and while attempts were made to reign in anti-Chinese measures by the Mexican federal government, using the war between Japan and China as a reason to stop deporting Chinese, Mexican states continued in the anti-Chinese campaign to drive Chinese out of states like Sinora and Sinaloa with citizenship being stripped from Mexican women who were married to Chinese men, labeled as "race traitors" and from the United States, Sinaloa, and Sonora, both Mexican women, their Chinese husbands and their mixed children were expelled to China

There was a more widespread general anti-foreign sentiment sweeping through Mexico which was against Arabs, eastern Europeans, and Jews, in addition to Chinese, with the anti-Chinese movement being part of this bigger campaign, a Mexican anti-foreign pamphlet exhorted Mexicans to "not spend one penny on the Chinese, Russians, Poles, Czechoslovacs, Lithuanians, Greeks, Jews, Sirio-Lebanese, etc." a poster advocated "boycott sabotage, and expulsion from the country of all foreigners in general, considered as pernicious and undesirable." and warned against Chinese men marrying Mexican women, saying "WHATEVER IT COSTS, MEXICAN WOMAN! Do not fall asleep, help your racial brothers boycott the undesirable foreigners, who steal the bread from our children."

Many Chinese migrated into Sinaloa and into cities such as Mazatlán up to the 1920s where they engaged in business and married Mexican women, this led to the expulsion of Chinese in the 1930s and Sinaloa passed laws expelling the Chinese in 1933, leading to the break up of mixed Chinese Mexican families and Mexican women to be deported to China with their Chinese husbands.

After several hundred Chinese men and their mixed families of Mexican wives and Mexican Chinese children were expelled from Mexico into the United States, the Immigration and Naturalization Service (INS) took charge of these people, took their testimonies and labelled them as refugees before sending them to China, the U.S. immigration employees also included under the category "Chinese refugees from Mexico", the Mexican women and mixed Chinese Mexican children who accompanied the Chinese men and sent them all to China instead of sending the mixed children and Mexican women to Mexico in spite of it having been cheaper, since at this era of history laws and convention regarding citizenship held that women were controlled by their husbands and when they married foreign men, women had their citizenship stripped from them so the women were dealt with by their husbands' standing and conditions so while Chinese men had their testimonies collected, the Mexican women were not interviewed by U.S. immigration officials, and the Mexican women and the mixed Chinese Mexican families were sent to China, even Mexican women who were not officially married but were engaged in relationships with Chinese men. Sinaloa and Sonora saw most of their Chinese population and mixed Chinese Mexican families deported due to the virulent anti-Chinese movement.

The anti-Chinese sentiment in Mexico was spurred on by the onset of the Great Depression, Chinese started to come to Mexico in the late 19th century and the majority of them were in trade and owners of businesses when the Maderistas came into power, marrying Mexican women and siring mixed race children with them which resulted in a law banning Chinese-Mexican marriages in 1923 in Sonora and another law forcing Chinese into ghettos two years after, and in Sinaloa, Sonora, and Chihuahua, the Chinese were driven out in the early 1930s with northern Mexico seeing 11,000 Chinese expelled in total.

The maternal grandfather of Mexican singer Ana Gabriel was a Chinese man named Yang Quing Yong Chizon who adopted the name Roberto in Mexico.

United States

According to the United States Census Bureau, concerning multi-racial families in 1990:

According to James P. Allen and Eugene Turner from California State University, Northridge, by some calculations, the largest part-European bi-racial population is European/Native American and Alaskan Native, at 7,015,017; followed by European/African at 737,492; then European/Asian at 727,197; and finally European/Native Hawaiian and Other Pacific Islander at 125,628.

The U.S. census has categorized Eurasian responses in the "Some other race" section as belonging to the Asian category.  The Eurasian responses the US census officially recognizes are Indo-European, Amerasian, and Eurasian.
Starting with the 2000 census, people have been allowed to mark more than one "race" on the U.S. census, and many have identified as both Asian and European. Defining Eurasians as those who were marked as both "white" and "Asian" in the census, there were 868,395 Eurasians in the United States in 2000 and 1,623,234 in 2010.

Accusations of support for miscegenation were commonly made by slavery defenders against abolitionists before the US Civil War. After the War, similar charges were used by white segregationists against advocates of equal rights for African Americans. They were said to be secretly plotting the destruction of the white race through miscegenation. In the 1950s, segregationists alleged a Communist plot funded by the Soviet Union with that goal. In 1957, segregationists cite the antisemitic hoax A Racial Program for the Twentieth Century as evidence for these claims.

From the nineteenth to the mid-twentieth century, the Chinese who migrated to the United States were almost entirely of Cantonese origin. Anti-miscegenation laws in many states prohibited Chinese men from marrying white women. In the mid-1850s, 70 to 150 Chinese were living in New York City, and 11 of them married Irish women. In 1906 the New York Times (6 August) reported that 300 white women (Irish American) were married to Chinese men in New York, with many more cohabited. In 1900, based on Liang research, of the 120,000 men in more than 20 Chinese communities in the United States, he estimated that one out of every 20 Chinese men (Cantonese) was married to white women.  In the 1960s census showed 3500 Chinese men married to white women and 2900 Chinese women married to white men.

Twenty-five percent of married Asian American women have white spouses, but 45% of cohabitating Asian American women are with white American men. Of cohabiting Asian men, slightly over 37% of Asian men have white female partners and over 10% married to white women. Asian American women and Asian American men live with a white partner, 40% and 27%, respectively (Le, 2006b). In 2008, of new marriages including an Asian man, 80% were to an Asian spouse and 14% to a white spouse; of new marriages involving an Asian woman, 61% were to an Asian spouse and 31% to a white spouse.

Hawaii

The majority of early Hawaiian Chinese were Cantonese-speaking immigrants, with a small number of Hakka speakers. If all people with Chinese ancestry in Hawaii (including the Sino-Hawaiians) are included, they form about one-third of Hawaii's entire population. Many thousands of them married women of Hawaiian, Hawaiian/European and European origin. A large percentage of the Chinese men married Hawaiian and Hawaiian European women. While a minority married white women in Hawaii were with Portuguese women. The 12,592 Asiatic Hawaiians enumerated in 1930 were the result of Chinese men intermarrying with Hawaiian and part Hawaiian European. Most Asiatic Hawaiians men also married Hawaiians and European women (and vice versa). On the census some Chinese with little native blood would be classified as Chinese not an Asiatic Hawaiians due to dilution of native blood. Intermarriage started to decline in the 1920s. Portuguese and other Caucasian women married Chinese men. These unions between Chinese men and Portuguese women resulted in children of mixed Chinese Portuguese parentage, called Chinese-Portuguese. For two years to 30 June 1933, 38 of these children were born, they were classified as pure Chinese because their fathers were Chinese. A large amount of mingling took place between Chinese and Portuguese, Chinese men married Portuguese, Spanish, Hawaiian, Caucasian-Hawaiian, etc. Only one Chinese man was recorded marrying an American woman. Chinese men in Hawaii also married Puerto Rican, Portuguese, Japanese, Greek, and half-white women.

Oceania

Australia

Most of the early Australian Chinese population consisted of Cantonese-speaking migrants from Guangzhou and Taishan as well as some Hokkien-speaking immigrants. They migrated to Australia during the gold rush period of the 1850s. Marriage records show that between the 1850s and the start of the twentieth century, there were about 2000 legal marriages between white women and migrant Chinese men in Australia's eastern colonies, probably with similar numbers involved in de facto relationships of various kinds.

A Chinese man Sun San Lung and his son by his white European Australian wife Lizzie in Castlemaine returned to China in 1887 for a trip after marrying a second white wife after Lizzie died, but they were blocked from coming back to Melbourne. Chinese men were found living with 73 opium addicted Australian white women when Quong Tart surveyed the goldfields for opium addicts, and many homeless women abused by husbands and prostitutes ran away and married Chinese men in Sydney after taking refuge in Chinese opium dens in gambling houses, Reverend Francis Hopkins said that "A Chinaman's Anglo-Saxon wife is almost his God, a European's is his slave. This is the reason why so many girls transfer their affections to the almond-eyed Celestials." when giving the reason why these women married Chinese men. After the gold mining ended some Chinese remained in Australia and started families, one youthful Englishwoman married a Chinese in 1870 in Bendigo and the Golden Dragon Museum is run by his great-grandson Russell Jack.

The Australian sniper Billy Sing was the son of a Chinese father and an English mother. His parents were John Sing (c. 1842–1921), a drover from Shanghai, China, and Mary Ann Sing (née Pugh; c. 1857–unknown), a nurse from Kingswinford, Staffordshire, England.

The rate of intermarriage declined as stories of the viciousness of Chinese men towards white women spread, mixed with increasing opposition to intermarriage. In late 1878, there were 181 marriages between women of European descent and Chinese men as well as 171 such couples cohabiting without matrimony, resulting in the birth of 586 children of Sino-European descent. Such a rate of intermarriage between Chinese Australians and white Australians was to continue until the 1930s.

South America

Argentina

Today, there are an estimated of 180,000 Asian-Argentines, with 120,000 of Chinese descent, 32,000 of Japanese descent, 25,000 of Korean descent.

Brazil

Common estimates generally include about 25–35% of Japanese Brazilians as multiracial, being generally over 50–60% among the yonsei, or fourth-generation outside Japan. In Brazil, home to the largest Japanese community overseas, miscegenation is celebrated, and it promoted racial integration and mixing over the nineteenth and twentieth centuries, nevertheless as a way of dealing with and assimilating its non-white population, submitted to white elites, with no dangers of uprisings that would put its status quo in risk .
While culture shock was strong for the first and second generations of Japanese Brazilians, and the living conditions in the fazendas (plantation farms) after the slavery crisis were sometimes worse than in Asia, Brazil stimulated immigration as means of substitution for the lost workforce, and any qualms about the non-whiteness of the Japanese were quickly forgotten. After Japan became one of the world's most developed and rich nations, the Japanese in Brazil and their culture as well gained an image of progress, instead of the old bad perception of a people which would not be assimilated or integrated as its culture and race were deemed as diametrically opposed to the Brazilian ones.

In the censuses, self-reported amarelos (literally "yellows" i.e. Mongolics, people racially East Asian) include about 2,100,000 people, or around 1% of the Brazilian population. A greater number of persons may have Japanese and less commonly Chinese and Korean ancestry, but identify as white (Brazilian society has no one drop rule), pardo (i.e. brown-skinned multiracial or assimilated Amerindian, pardo stands for a Brazilian darker than white and lighter than black, but not necessarily implying a white-black admixture) or Afro-Brazilian. When it comes to religion, self-reported Asian Brazilians are only less Irreligious than whites, and a little more Catholic than Amerindians. They are the least group when it comes to traditional churches of Christianity, and also the least group in percent of Protestants, and Evangelicals or Pentecostals as well. Asian Brazilians have the highest income per capita according to the 2010 census.

Peru

About 100,000 Cantonese coolies (almost all males) in 1849 to 1874 migrated to Peru and intermarried with Peruvian women of mestizo, European, Amerindian, European/mestizo (castizo), African and mulatto origin. Many Peruvian Chinese and Peruvian Japanese today are of Spanish, Italian, German, African and American origin. Estimates for Chinese-Peruvian is about 1.3–1.6 millions. Asian Peruvians are estimated to be 3% of the population, but one source places the number of citizens with some Chinese ancestry at 4.2 million, which equates to 15% of the country's total population. In Peru, non-Chinese women married the mostly male Chinese coolies.

See also
Eurasian Steppe
Tatars
Crimean Tatars
Turkic peoples
Eurasian nomads
Steppe Route
Afro-Asians
Euronesian
Sámi people
Multiracial people

References

External links
 AngloIndians.com – Anglo-Indian resources & matrimony
 Malaysian Dutch Descendants Project
 Maleisie.be article on Malaysian Dutch Descendants
 Eurasians: A Resource Guide

Ethnic groups in Asia
Ethnic groups in Europe